Robert William Lowry is an American pastor, speaker, and LGBTQIA+ activist ordained in the Presbyterian Church USA. Lowry serves as senior pastor of Westover Hills Presbyterian Church in Little Rock, Arkansas.

Early life and family 
Lowry was born and raised in Little Rock, Arkansas. The oldest of two children born to Catherine (née Ostner), a college professor, and Robert Cunningham Lowry, an attorney. Through his father, Lowry is directly descended from Dr. Matthew Cunningham, the first mayor of Little Rock, Arkansas. He was educated in the Little Rock Public schools and attended Little Rock Central High School. He holds a Bachelor of Arts from Millsaps College as well as the Master of Divinity from Austin Presbyterian Theological Seminary, the Master of Theological Studies from Garrett-Evangelical Theological Seminary, and the Doctor of Ministry from Columbia Theological Seminary. in 2020 Lowry married attorney Brian Smith in a private service in Jackson.

Advocacy and public activism 
Lowry is notable as the first openly gay Presbyterian pastor in Arkansas and Mississippi and one of the first in the Presbyterian Church (USA) as a whole. He and colleagues led a group of clergy in opposition to Arkansas's HB 1228 the so-called “religious freedom” bill  as well as joining colleagues in opposing an earlier “bathroom bill” aimed at transgender persons. The resulting public outcry along with opposition from Wal-Mart and other corporate leaders in the state led to the bill's abandonment at the end of the legislative term. In 2015 in recognition of his work for LGBTQIA+ equality, the Arkansas Times named Lowry one of 25 Visionary Arkansans shaping the state.

His leadership of an open and affirming congregation in Jackson, Mississippi and his work in the larger community to promote safe places for LGBTQIA+ people led to a feature episode in the PBS docuseries Prideland. Despite threats to the network and Lowry personally, the series premiered as scheduled and became one of the most successful digital features on the network.

Lowry is an occasional contributor to both local and National media on topics including the role of religion in public life, LGBTQIA+ rights, politics, and gun violence prevention.

Following the adoption of a resolution at the 225th General assembly of the Presbyterian Church (USA) referring to Israel as “in apartheid state,“ Lowry took a public stand against the church’s action. Congregation B’nai Israel, Reform Jewish congregation, invited Lowry to speak on the topic at a Friday evening Shabbat service.

Pastorates 
Lowry has served in a number of positions in the Presbyterian Church (USA) as both an installed (permanent) and interim/transitional (temporary) pastor including:
 First Presbyterian Church Shreveport, LA Associate Pastor 2001-2002
 First Presbyterian Church Ann Arbor, MI Associate Pastor 2002-2005
 First Presbyterian Church Searcy, AR Transitional Pastor 2007-2010
 First Presbyterian Church Batesville, AR Transitional Pastor 2010-2011
 First Presbyterian Church Clarksville, AR Transitional Pastor 2011-2016
 Harmony Presbyterian Church Clarksville, AR Transitional Pastor 2011-2016
 Fondren Presbyterian Church Jackson, MS Senior Pastor 2017-2022
 Westover Hills Presbyterian Church Little Rock, AR Senior Pastor 2022–Present 

Lowry has also taught as an adjunct professor at Hendrix College and the University of the Ozarks. From 2015-2017 he also served as the Stated Clerk of the Presbytery of Arkansas.

References 

Living people
American Presbyterian ministers
American LGBT rights activists
Presbyterians from Arkansas
People from Little Rock, Arkansas
Millsaps College alumni
Columbia Theological Seminary alumni
Year of birth missing (living people)